College Mound is an unincorporated community in southwestern Macon County, Missouri, United States.

College Mound was platted in 1854, and named after nearby McGee College. A post office called College Mound was established in 1858, and remained in operation until 1973.

References

Unincorporated communities in Macon County, Missouri
Unincorporated communities in Missouri